ALARP ("as low as reasonably practicable"), or ALARA ("as low as reasonably achievable"), is a principle in the regulation and management of safety-critical and safety-involved systems. The principle is that the residual risk shall be reduced as far as reasonably practicable. In UK and NZ Health and Safety law, it is equivalent to SFAIRP ("so far as is reasonably practicable"). In the US, ALARA is used in the regulation of radiation risks.

For a risk to be ALARP, it must be possible to demonstrate that the cost involved in reducing the risk further would be grossly disproportionate to the benefit gained. Not to be confused with the ALARP program offered in many high schools, the ALARP principle arises from the fact that infinite time, effort and money could be spent in the attempt of reducing a risk to zero; not the fact that reducing the risk in half would require a finite time, effort and money. It should not be understood as simply a quantitative measure of benefit against detriment. It is more a best common practice of judgement of the balance of risk and societal benefit.

Factors
In this context, risk is the combination of the frequency (likelihood) and the consequence of a specified hazardous event.

Several factors are likely to be considered when deciding whether or not a risk has been reduced as far as reasonably practicable:
 Health and safety guidelines and codes of practice
 Manufacturer's specifications and recommendations
 Industry practice
 International standards and laws
 Suggestions from advisory bodies
 Comparison with similar hazardous events in other industries
 Cost of further measures would be disproportionate to the risk reduction they would achieve

Another factor is often the cost of assessing the improvement gained in an attempted risk reduction. In extremely complex systems, this can be very high, and could be the limiting factor in practicability of risk reduction, although according to UK HSE guidance, cost alone should never be a justification for taking extra safety risks.

Determining that a risk has been reduced to ALARP involves an assessment of the risk to be avoided, of the sacrifice (in money, time and trouble) involved in taking measures to avoid that risk, and a comparison of the two. This is a cost–benefit analysis.

Origin in UK law
The term ALARP arises from UK legislation, particularly the Health and Safety at Work etc. Act 1974, which requires "Provision and maintenance of plant and systems of work that are, so far as is reasonably practicable, safe and without risks to health". The phrase So Far As is Reasonably Practicable (SFARP) in this and similar clauses is interpreted as leading to a requirement that risks must be reduced to a level that is As Low As is Reasonably Practicable (ALARP).

The key question in determining whether a risk is ALARP is the definition of reasonably practicable. This term has been enshrined in the UK case law since the case of Edwards v. National Coal Board in 1949. The ruling was that the risk must be significant in relation to the sacrifice (in terms of money, time or trouble) required to avert it: risks must be averted unless there is a gross disproportion between the costs and benefits of doing so.

Including gross disproportion means that an ALARP judgement in the UK is not a simple cost benefit analysis, but is weighted to favour carrying out the safety improvement. However, there is no broad consensus on the precise factor that would be appropriate.

Use outside the UK
The ALARP or ALARA principle is mandated by particular legislation in some countries outside the UK, including Australia, the Netherlands and Norway.  Where the ALARP principle is used, it may not have the same implications as in the UK, as "reasonably practicable" may be interpreted according to the local culture, without introducing the concept of gross disproportionality.

The term ALARA, or "as low as reasonably achievable" is used interchangeably in the United States of America. It is used in the field of radiation protection. Its application in the regulation of radiation risk in some areas has been challenged.

Starfish Medical, a company focusing on medical device contract manufacturing and product development, through the Medical Device Directive of Canada is undergoing extensive consideration of the transfer of ALARP to AFAP (“As Far As Possible”) specifically for the regulation of risk of medical devices. The ALARP concept contains legal interpretation of the regulatory process that promotes financial consideration in higher regard than of the requirements of safety and performance of medical devices. Contradicting this approach, AFAP requires that all ventures of safety must be addressed in the intent of the consumer and effectiveness of the product rather than capital gain of the corporation. Under AFAP standards there are two defined justifications for the lack of implementation of risk-preventative measures. The first indicates that the additional risk control will not provide additional support for the system, such as an additional alarm when a previous alarm is functioning. The second states that a risk control system does not have to be implemented if there is a more effective risk control that can not be simultaneously executed due to various scenarios such as spatial boundaries. By implementing this new standard of risk mitigation, companies must demonstrate that they have considered and implemented all necessary means of addressing risk of a product or developed system. 

In Australia the Work Health & Safety Act 2011 introduced the term So Far As Is Reasonably Practical (SFAIRP) based on the UK legislation.  In some industry sectors the term SFARIP has become the common usage and can be used interchangeably with ALARP, but some people believe that SFAIRP and ALARP are two different legal tests.

Legal challenge
A two-year legal battle in the European Court of Justice resulted in the SFAIRP principle being upheld on 18 January 2007.

The European Commission had claimed that the SFAIRP wording in the Health & Safety at Work Act did not fully implement the requirements of the Framework Directive. The Directive gives employers an absolute duty "to ensure the safety and health of workers in every aspect related to the work", whereas the Act qualifies the duty "So Far As is Reasonably Practicable". The court dismissed the action and ordered the Commission to pay the UK's costs.

Had the case been upheld, it would have called into question the proportionate approach to safety risk management embodied in the ALARP principle.

Carrot diagrams 

The carrot diagram is intended to show high (normally unacceptable) risks at the upper/wider end and low (broadly acceptable) risks at the lower/narrower end. The region in between is sometimes called the "ALARP region". However, this is misleading because there is no legal requirement for risks to be tolerable, nor any recognition that low risks may be regarded as broadly acceptable. ALARP refers to the principle of testing further risk reduction against the cost of this reduction effort. It therefore applies to all regions, so the diagram is a misinterpretation of UK law.

See also
 Safety integrity level

References

External links
UK Health and Safety Executive ALARP Guidance
UK Health and Safety Executive ALARP Cost Benefit Analysis
UK Defence Standard 00-56 Safety Management Requirements

Safety
Risk management